Kupychiv (also called Kupiczów Czeski – Czech Kupychiv) is a village located in northwestern Ukraine in Volhynia. The village is in Kovel raion of Volyn Oblast, but was formerly administered within Turiisk Raion. The village has a population of 854.

History 
In the Second Polish Republic, Kupychiv (then Kupiczów) was part of the Kovel county, Volhynian Voivodeship. In 1939, it had around 1000 inhabitants, most of whom were Czechs, also some Poles and Jews. In the village there was a Roman-Catholic church as well as a Hussite chapel.

During the Massacres of Poles in Volhynia, Kupychiv became one of centers of Czech self-defence, which, allied with local Poles, together fought Ukrainian nationalists of the Ukrainian Insurgent Army. In the summer of 1943, the Ukrainians tried to capture the village, but failed. After 1944, when Volhynia became part of the Soviet Union, most of Czech and Polish survivors left the village.

Gallery

External links

List of families living in pre-1939 Kupiczow
List of villages in Volhynia 

Volhynian Voivodeship (1569–1795)
Volhynian Governorate
Wołyń Voivodeship (1921–1939)

Villages in Kovel Raion